Liu Ping (born 1 May 1987 in Beijing) is a Chinese water polo player. She was part of the silver medal winning team at the 2007 World Junior Championship. She also competed at the 2008 and 2012 Summer Olympics.

See also
 List of World Aquatics Championships medalists in water polo

References

External links
 

1987 births
Living people
Chinese female water polo players
Olympic water polo players of China
Sportspeople from Beijing
Water polo players at the 2008 Summer Olympics
Water polo players at the 2012 Summer Olympics
Asian Games medalists in water polo
Water polo players at the 2010 Asian Games
Water polo players at the 2014 Asian Games
World Aquatics Championships medalists in water polo
Asian Games gold medalists for China
Medalists at the 2010 Asian Games
Medalists at the 2014 Asian Games
Universiade medalists in water polo
Universiade gold medalists for China
Medalists at the 2009 Summer Universiade
Medalists at the 2011 Summer Universiade
21st-century Chinese women